= Trochida =

Trochida Temporal range: Ordovician–Recent

Scientific classification
- Domain: Eukaryota
- Kingdom: Animalia
- Phylum: Mollusca
- Class: Gastropoda
- Subclass: Vetigastropoda
- Order: Trochida

Superfamilies
- See text

Order of sea snails

Trochida is an order of small to very large vetigastropods. It includes recent and extinct sea snails with gills and an operculum.

== Taxonomy ==
Extant trochomorphs stem from a large, archaic clade. According to Uribe et al. (2016) the superfamilies Angarioidea and Phasianelloidea are deeply nested within the superfamily Trochoidea sensu Williams (2012). The revised taxonomy (2017) of Bouchet et al. therefore only recognizes the superfamily Trochoidea (including Angarioidea and Phasianelloidea).

== Superfamilies ==
- Trochoidea Rafinesque, 1815

Synonyms

- Angarioidea Gray, 1857: synonym of Trochoidea Rafinesque, 1815
- Phasianelloidea Swainson, 1840: synonym of Trochoidea Rafinesque, 1815
